Vuk Bogdanović (born 3 April 2002) is a Serbian professional footballer who plays as a centre back for Serbian SuperLiga club Vojvodina.

Club career 
After the junior selections he passed in Red Star Belgrade, Bogdanović moved to Voždovac and continued his football education there. As the captain of the youth team, he joined the first team with which he went through winter training in Antalya in 2021. He made his debut in the match against Partizan in the quarter finals of the Serbian Cup, entering the game instead of Nemanja Milojević in the 77th minute. In the Serbian SuperLiga he also made his debut against Partizan, two months later. In June 2021, Bogdanović was presented as a new football player of Spartak with whom he signed a three-year contract. At the end of the same calendar year, the cooperation was terminated. He played half a season in the Rad jersey, after which he returned to Red Star Belgrade and signed a three-year contract.

References

External links
 
 
 

2002 births
Serbian footballers
Footballers from Belgrade
FK Voždovac players
FK Spartak Subotica players
FK Rad players
Red Star Belgrade footballers
Association football defenders
Serbian First League players
Living people